Andrew James Alexander Mango (14 June 1926 – 6 July 2014) was a British BBC employee and author.

Life
He was born in Istanbul, one of three sons of Alexander Mango, an Italian-Greek barrister and his  White Russian wife Adelaide Damonov; the Byzantinist Cyril Mango was his younger brother. He was brought up in Istanbul and mastered a number of languages.

While still young, Mango took a job as press officer in the British Embassy at Ankara. He moved to the United Kingdom in 1947 and lived in London until his death. He held degrees from the University of London, including a doctorate on Persian literature.

Mango joined the BBC's Turkish section while a student and spent his entire career in the External Services, rising to be Turkish Programme Organiser and then Head of the South European Service. He retired in 1986. He died at the age of 88 on 6 July 2014. His death was announced by Richard Moore, the British Ambassador to Turkey.

Works
Turkey (1968)
Discovering Turkey (1971)
Turkey: The Challenge of a New Role (1994)
Atatürk: The Biography of the Founder of Modern Turkey (1999)
The Turks Today (2004)
Turkey and the War on Terrorism (2005)
From the Sultan to Atatürk — Turkey (2009)

His background in Persian and Arabic studies allowed Mango to master Ottoman Turkish. He wrote his PhD thesis at the SOAS on Alexander the Great. Where he later throughout his career would also lecture as guest, and advise on modern Turkish studies.

Mango published his first book in 1968, while he was working for the BBC. After his retirement his productivity increased. His book on Kemal Atatürk, from 1999, established an international reputation.

Notes

References
 Barchard, David, "The Brothers Mango", Cornucopia Magazine No 19, Winter 1999 (excerpt).
 Christopher de Bellaigue, Article about Mango, New York Review of Books
 Finkel, Caroline, Osman's Dream, (Basic Books, 2005), 57; "Istanbul was only adopted as the city's official name in 1930."
 Sanberk, Özdem, "Obituary for Andrew Mango (1926-2014)"  Hürriyet Daily News 8 July 2014.

1926 births
2014 deaths
British biographers
British non-fiction writers
Historians of Turkey
Mass media people from Istanbul
Alumni of the University of London
Alumni of SOAS University of London
British male writers
British people of Greek descent
Turkish people of Russian descent
Turkish people of Italian descent
Turkish people of Greek descent
Turkish emigrants to the United Kingdom
Male non-fiction writers
Recipients of the Order of Merit of the Republic of Turkey